The Hebrus Valles are an ancient system of troughs and valleys in the Amenthes quadrangle of Mars, located at 20.2° north latitude and 233.4° west longitude. They are 317 km long and were named after a river in the Balkans which runs through present day Bulgaria, Greece and Turkey. Some authors have identified the troughs and valleys of Hebrus Valles as outflow channels, but their origin and history remain ambiguous.  It has been considered as a potential site for human exploration due to the presence of icy caves.

Geology 
The Hebrus Valles have tributaries, terraces, and teardrop shaped islands. These features are all characteristic of erosion by fluid flow, but may or may not support the identification of this feature as carved by a single catastrophic outburst flood of water (as the term outflow channel would imply).  The flood would have occurred during the early Amazonian.  There is also an extensive cave network which is expected to contain water ice.

See also
 Geology of Mars
 Outflow channels

References 

Valleys and canyons on Mars
Amenthes quadrangle